Pennsylvania Route 148 (PA 148) is a , north–south state highway located in Allegheny County, Pennsylvania. The southern terminus is at PA 48 in McKeesport.  The northern terminus is at U.S. Route 30 (US 30) in East McKeesport.

Route description

The street names along PA 148 include Walnut Street, Lysle Boulevard, and 5th Avenue.

PA 148 begins at PA 48 in the city of McKeesport, just outside the town of Versailles, and goes northwest, paralleling the Youghiogheny River to downtown McKeesport.  In downtown McKeesport, PA 148 turns east to parallel the Monongahela River to an interchange with the McKeesport-Duquesne Bridge and Bowman Avenue.  The route continues northeast to the town of East McKeesport where it terminates at US 30.

Three of the Allegheny County belt system routes connect with PA 148. The Orange Belt intersects with PA 148's southern terminus.  The Yellow Belt runs along PA 148 for 4 miles from Walnut St. in downtown McKeesport to its northern terminus at US 30 in East McKeesport. The Green Belt terminates at the interchange with the McKeesport-Duquesne Bridge.

History
The route was first signed in 1928, from the current PA 48 alignment to US 30.  In the 1950s, the route changed alignment to its current route, with minor fluctuations through the years.

Major intersections

PA 148 Truck

Pennsylvania Route 148 Truck is a  truck route located in Allegheny County in Pennsylvania.  The entire route lies in the town of McKeesport.  There have been times where the route was unsigned, but in 2006, markers were erected. The route follows Market Street, two blocks to the west and significantly wider than Walnut Street, which mainline Route 148 follows.

See also

References

External links

Pennsylvania Highways: PA 148

148
Transportation in Allegheny County, Pennsylvania